The white-bellied bush chat (Saxicola gutturalis) is a species of bird in the family Muscicapidae.  It is found in Semau, Timor and Rote Island.  Its natural habitats are subtropical or tropical moist lowland forests and dry savanna.  It is threatened by habitat loss.

References

External links
Xeno-canto: audio recordings of the white-bellied bush chat

white-bellied bush chat
Birds of Timor
white-bellied bush chat
Taxa named by Louis Jean Pierre Vieillot
Taxonomy articles created by Polbot